The Hopeton Earthworks are an Ohio Hopewell culture archaeological site consisting of mounds and earthwork enclosures. The site is a detached portion of the Hopewell Culture National Historic Park, along with the Mound City Group, Hopewell Mound Group, Seip Earthworks, Spruce Hill Earthworks and the High Bank Works. The site is open to the public.

Survey history

Squier and Davis: 1846
Ephraim George Squier and Edwin Hamilton Davis visited the site in 1846. They would discuss their findings from surveying Hopeton in their 1848 book, Ancient Monuments of the Mississippi Valley. They describe the site as consisting of main works with a set of smaller works to the right of the main. There is a rectangle shaped work "with an attached circle, the latter extending into the former, instead of being connected with it in the usual manner." The circle is located "somewhat to the right of a line drawn through the centre of the rectangle, parallel to its longest sides."

The site was reported as having 12 gateways, averaging  in width. The east side of the earthworks were reported as having two more circles.

The walls are loam. Unlike many other earthworks, there is no ditch on either side of the walls. Squier and Davis were impressed by the size of the walls, stating that "they resemble the heavy grading of a railway, and are broad enough, on the top, to admit the passage of a coach." The circle walls are shorter than the rectangle walls, and Squier and Davis believed this to be due to farming. They noted that the clay used to build the circle was different colors than the earth the earthworks were built upon.

Squier and Davis surveyed that parallel walls traveled from the northwestern corner of the rectangle to the river it the southwest. They did not believe that these walls were directly connected to the main works of the site. They end at "the edge of the terrace," where the "river once had its course." Both are described as being straight in design. They noted that excavations throughout the area, one is a large hole, others were random removals of soil, but not enough removed to have created the earthworks. No large mounds were found at the time of excavation, but two small oval shaped elevations were discovered. There were also two small mounds in the rectangle.

After their survey, Squier and Davis concluded that the site was used as a fortification.

References

External links
National Park Service Hopeton Earthworks site
Hopeton Earthworks from the Ohio Historical Society

Ohio Hopewell
National Historic Landmarks in Ohio
National Register of Historic Places in Ross County, Ohio
Mounds in Ohio